Rhagoditta susa is a species of solifuge within the family Rhagodidae found distributed in Iran. 2 specimens of the species have been found, with 1 being 5 to 15 kilometers off a road to Tehran, and the other in the ruins of Susa.

References 

Taxa named by Carl Friedrich Roewer
Solifugae
Animals described in 1933
Arthropods of Iran